Hu Yongfa (born 20 September 1993) is a Chinese footballer currently playing as a defender for Ji'nan Xingzhou, on loan from Chengdu Rongcheng.

Club career
Hu Yongfa would play for the Shanghai Shenxin youth team before being promoted to their senior team in the 2016 China League One season. After only one campaign and a chance to return to Guangdong he joined third tier club Guangdong South China Tiger on 18 January 2017. In his debut season he would establish himself as a vital member of the team that came runners-up in the division and promotion to the second tier.

After three seasons at Guangdong South China Tiger the club dissolved due to wage arrears and Hu Yongfa joined another second tier club in Chengdu Rongcheng. After two seasons with the club he would establish himself as a regular within the team and aid them to promotion at the end of the 2021 league campaign.

Career statistics
.

References

External links

1993 births
Living people
Chinese footballers
Association football defenders
China League One players
China League Two players
Guangzhou City F.C. players
Shanghai Shenxin F.C. players
Guangdong South China Tiger F.C. players
Chengdu Rongcheng F.C. players